Katie Startup (born 28 January 1999) is an English professional football goalkeeper for FA Women's Super League club Brighton and Hove Albion.

Club career

Early career 
While attending Maidstone Grammar School for Girls, Startup played football for the school team and was picked up by Meridian Girls FC. From there she joined Gillingham and then Chelsea.

Charlton Athletic Women 
Startup began her senior career in 2017 at Charlton Athletic Women, in third tier of women's football. Here, she helped Charlton achieve promotion to the Women's Championship.

The following season, Startup played in all 20 matches of the 2018/19 campaign. Charlton finished in third place, narrowly missing out on promotion to Tottenham Hotspur Women in second, five points ahead.  During this season, Startup kept eight clean sheets, and was nominated for the November 2018 Women's Championship Player of the Month. However, Startup missed out to Mollie Green, who was at Manchester United W.F.C at the time.

The 2019/20 season was less successful for Startup and Charlton. Charlton failed to win in any of their 12 games, before the season was terminated, however Startup managed to keep one clean sheet during the season, in a 0–0 draw against Lewes.

In October 2019, Startup raised awareness for mental health and suicide by changing her kit number from 1 to 40.

Brighton & Hove Albion WFC 
After Startup's impressive performances in the Women's Championship, she caught the eye of Brighton, who snatched up her services in the summer of 2020, and signed her on a 2-year contract.

Startup made her debut for Brighton in the Women's FA cup against Huddersfield on 16 May 2020.

Return to Charlton Athletic 
Shortly after signing for Brighton, Startup returned to Charlton on a short-term loan in the 2020/21 season.

Startup made her first appearance since returning from to Charlton against Crystal Palace in a 2–2 draw. She made three other appearances for Charlton that season, coming against Blackburn Rovers LFC, Liverpool Women, and Coventry United Ladies.

Startup kept her first and only clean sheet of her four appearances against Blackburn, in a 1–0 victory away from home.

International career 
Startup has represented England at an U17 and U19 level.

References 

Charlton Athletic W.F.C. players
Brighton & Hove Albion W.F.C. players
Living people
1999 births
Women's association football goalkeepers
Women's Championship (England) players
Liverpool F.C. Women players
Chelsea F.C. Women players
England women's youth international footballers
Footballers from Kent
English women's footballers